A World Heritage Site is a location that is listed by UNESCO as having outstanding cultural or natural value to the common heritage of humanity. The World Heritage Committee has designated 37 World Heritage Sites in Oceania. These are in 14 countries, with the majority of sites located in Australia. The first three inscriptions from the region, the Great Barrier Reef, Kakadu National Park and the Willandra Lakes, were in 1981—three years after the list's creation. The region contains the world's three largest sites: Phoenix Islands Protected Area, Papahānaumokuākea, and the Great Barrier Reef. In addition, the Tasmanian Wilderness is one of only two sites that meet seven out of the ten criteria for World Heritage listing (Mount Tai in China being the other).

Each year, the World Heritage Committee may inscribe new sites on the list, or delist sites that no longer meet the criteria. Selection is based on ten criteria: six for cultural heritage (i–vi) and four for natural heritage (vii–x). Some sites, designated mixed sites, represent both cultural and natural heritage. In Oceania there are 11 cultural, 19 natural and 7 mixed sites. UNESCO may also specify that a site is in danger, stating "conditions which threaten the very characteristics for which a property was inscribed on the World Heritage List." In 2013, the Committee added East Rennell to the List of World Heritage in Danger because of the threat of logging activities to the site's outstanding universal value.

Legend
The list below includes all sites located geographically within Oceania, and is constructed without reference to UNESCO's statistical divisions. The list comprises a number of sites for which the state party is outside the region, but the site itself is located in Oceania; this includes sites belonging to Chile (Rapa Nui National Park), France (Lagoons of New Caledonia and Taputapuātea), the United Kingdom (Henderson Island), and the United States (Hawaii Volcanoes National Park, Papahānaumokuākea).

Site – named after the World Heritage Committee's official designation.
Location – sorted by country, followed by the region at the regional or provincial level. In the case of multinational or multi-regional sites, the names are sorted alphabetically.
Criteria – as defined by the World Heritage Committee.
Area – in hectares and acres, excluding any buffer zones. A value of zero implies that no data has been published by UNESCO.
Year – during which the site was inscribed to the World Heritage List.
Description – brief information about the site. None of the sites in this list have been classified as endangered.

Sites

Map of sites

Tentative List

The Tentative List is an inventory of important heritage and natural sites that a country is considering for inscription on the World Heritage List. The Tentative List can be updated at any time, but inclusion on the list is a prerequisite to being considered for inscription.

Notes

References

External links 

UNESCO World Heritage Centre – Official site
UNESCO World Heritage List – Official site
Worldheritage-Forum – Information and weblog on World Heritage issues

Oceania
World Heritage Sites